Frank May was the Chief Cashier of the Bank of England from 1873 to 1893. May was replaced as Chief Cashier by Horace Bowen.

References

External links

Chief Cashiers of the Bank of England
Year of birth missing
Year of death missing